The 1995 Carquest Bowl may refer to:

 1995 Carquest Bowl (January) - January 2, 1995, game between the South Carolina Gamecocks and the West Virginia Mountaineers
 1995 Carquest Bowl (December) - December 30, 1995, game between the North Carolina Tar Heels and the Arkansas Razorbacks